The list of ship launches in 1997 includes a chronological list of all ships launched in 1997.


References

1997
Ship launches